The Blacherne is a historic apartment building located at Indianapolis, Indiana.  It was built in 1895, and is a large seven-story, 6 bay by 15 bay, red pressed brick building on a limestone foundation.  It features two circular projecting bays at the corners and a semicircular limestone Romanesque Revival style entry portal.

The building was constructed by Indiana native Lew Wallace with the royalties from his best selling novel Ben Hur. The building is named after the palace in Wallace's novel The Prince of India; or, Why Constantinople Fell (1893). He maintained a residence in the structure until his death. 

It was listed on the National Register of Historic Places in 1983.

Gallery

References

Apartment buildings in Indiana
Residential buildings on the National Register of Historic Places in Indiana
Romanesque Revival architecture in Indiana
Residential buildings completed in 1895
Residential buildings in Indianapolis
National Register of Historic Places in Indianapolis